Coupe T.O.M or The Pacific French Territories Cup is a cup competed for by clubs from Tahiti and New Caledonia. T.O.M. stands for Territoires d'Outre-Mer, which includes Tahiti and New Caledonia. The other two T.O.M.s are Wallis and Futuna, whose standard of football is much lower, and the Southern and Antarctic Lands, which are uninhabited except for scientific personnel. All inhabited T.O.M.s are now called C.O.M.s,  or overseas collectivities).  The winners qualify for the Outremer Champions Cup.

Previous winners

References
Championnat des Territoires Français du Pacifique (Coupe T.O.M.)

Football competitions in New Caledonia
Football competitions in French Polynesia
International club association football competitions in Oceania
TOM
Defunct international club association football competitions in Oceania